Jorge Zárate (born November 1, 1962) is a Mexican film, television, and theater actor. He is known for various roles in film and television, including his starring role as Amaro Rodríguez in the Telemundo telenovela Señora Acero and Esteban in the Mexican telenovela, Gente bien.

Early life and career 
Zárate, born in Mexico City, studied communications at the Metropolitan Autonomous University. He made his acting debut in 1984 and since then has participated in more than 30 plays and 20 films including Panchito Rex, Nicotina, Las Vueltas del Citrillo, Herod's Law, Hell, and Tlatelolco, verano del 68. In 2008, he won an Ariel Award for his role in the film Dos Abrazos.

Filmography

References

External links
 

Living people
Best Actor Ariel Award winners
Male actors from Mexico City
Mexican male film actors
Mexican male television actors
20th-century Mexican male actors
21st-century Mexican male actors
1962 births